The following is a list of buildings and structures classified as Schedule "A" and Schedule "B" heritage buildings by the City of Vancouver, British Columbia, Canada. These are designated heritage buildings, and as such are legally protected by the city's heritage by-law No. 4837.
The list does not include:
 Buildings in Gastown or Chinatown. These areas are geographically designated heritage sites by the province of British Columbia, although the city is responsible for protecting heritage buildings therein.
 Buildings and structures designated by By-laws enacted since 31 January 2003.
 Other heritage structures that may be protected by the federal or provincial governments.

Assembly
(Group A) - places used for people gathering for entertainment, worship, and eating or drinking. Examples: churches, restaurants (with 50 or more possible occupants), theatres, and stadiums.

Business
(Group B) - places where services are provided (not to be confused with mercantile, below). Examples: banks, insurance agencies, government buildings (including police and fire stations), and doctor's offices.

Educational
(Group E) - schools and day care centers up to the 12th grade.

Factory
(Group F) - places where goods are manufactured or repaired (unless considered "High-Hazard" (below)). Examples: factories and dry cleaners.

High-hazard
(Group H) - places involving production or storage of very flammable or toxic materials. Includes places handling explosives and/or highly toxic materials (such as fireworks, hydrogen peroxide, and cyanide).

Institutional
(Group I) - places where people are physically unable to leave without assistance. Examples: hospitals, nursing homes, and prisons. In some jurisdictions, Group I may be used to designate Industrial.

Mercantile
(Group M) - places where goods are displayed and sold. Examples: grocery stores, department stores, and gas stations.

Residential
(Group R) - places providing accommodations for overnight stay (excluding Institutional). Examples: houses, apartment buildings, hotels, and motels.

Storage
(Group S) - places where items are stored (unless considered High-Hazard). Examples: warehouses and parking garages.

Utility and miscellaneous
(Group U) - others. Examples: water towers, barns, towers.

See also
List of old Canadian buildings
List of tallest buildings in Vancouver
List of National Historic Sites of Canada in British Columbia
Architecture of Vancouver

References

"City of Vancouver Heritage By-laws - Schedule 'A' (Part 1)
"City of Vancouver Heritage By-law (No. 4837)
Vancouver Heritage

External links
Vancouver Heritage Register, City of Vancouver's comprehensive listing of heritage structures.
 Canada's Historic Places, a Federal, Provincial and Territorial Collaboration.
Canadian Register of Historic Places from Canada's Historic Places website (a federal/provincial/territorial government collaboration)
Heritage Branch, Province of British Columbia
Heritage Vancouver, non-profit lobby group
Vancouver Heritage Registry (unofficial compilation from various documents)
Vancouver Heritage - Chinatown Structures Unofficial digital inventory of Chinatown heritage structures.
Vancouver Heritage - Gastown Structures Unofficial digital inventory of Gastown heritage structures.

Vancouver
Vancouver
Heritage buildings